Cengkareng Timur is a subdistrict in the Cengkareng district of Jakarta. It has postal code of 11740.

See also 
 Cengkareng
 List of administrative villages of Jakarta

Administrative villages in Jakarta